The Tana labeo (Labeo mesops) is a species of ray-finned fish in the family Cyprinidae. It is endemic to Lake Malawi and the Shire River in Malawi. Its natural habitats are rivers and freshwater lakes. It is threatened by habitat loss and overfishing.

References

Labeo
Fish described in 1868
Taxa named by Albert Günther
Taxonomy articles created by Polbot